Savage Three (also known as Hot Mud) is a 1975 Italian poliziottesco-drama film written and directed by Vittorio Salerno.

Plot
Set in Italy in the mid-1970s, Ovidio Mainardi is by all appearances a quiet clerk in a large computer company. The monotony of the work and the existential loneliness of his marriage push Ovidio, along with two other friends, to embark upon a cynical and sadistic spree of violence.

Cast 

Enrico Maria Salerno: Inspector Santagà
Joe Dallesandro: Ovidio Mainardi
Martine Brochard: Alba
Gianfranco De Grassi: Giacomo Boatta
Guido De Carli: Pepe
Carmen Scarpitta: Raped Woman
Enzo Garinei: Director of the Research Centre
Sal Borghese: Keeper

Release
The film was released in Italy on September 20, 1975

References

External links

1970s Italian-language films
Poliziotteschi films
1975 crime drama films
Films set in Turin
Titanus films
Films with screenplays by Ernesto Gastaldi
1975 films
1970s Italian films